Stephanocereus is genus of cactus from Brazil, related to Arrojadoa. This genus was monotypic until Pilosocereus luetzelburgii was included here, resulting in the combination Stephanocereus luetzelburgii.

References 

Cactoideae genera
Taxa named by Alwin Berger